John Winthrop the Younger (February 12, 1606 – April 6, 1676) was an early governor of the Connecticut Colony, and he played a large role in the merger of several separate settlements into the unified colony.

Early life
Winthrop was born in Groton, Suffolk, England on February 12, 1606, the son of John Winthrop, founding governor of the Massachusetts Bay Colony. He was educated at the Bury St. Edmunds grammar school, King Edward VI School, and Trinity College, Dublin, and he studied law for a short time after 1624 at the Inner Temple, London.

Career
Winthrop accompanied the ill-fated expedition of the Duke of Buckingham for the relief of the Protestants of La Rochelle in France, and then travelled in Italy and the Levant, returning to England in 1629. In 1631, he followed his father to Massachusetts Bay Colony and was one of the assistants of the Colony in 1635, 1640, and 1641 and from 1644 to 1649. He was the chief founder of Agawam (now Ipswich, Massachusetts) in 1633, then went to England in 1634. He returned in 1635 as governor of lands that had been granted to Lord Say and Sele and Lord Brooke, and he sent out a party to build a fort named Saybrook in their honor, located at the mouth of the Connecticut River. He then lived for a time in Massachusetts, where he devoted himself to the study of science and attempted to interest the settlers in the development of the colony's mineral resources.

He was again in England in 1641–43, then returned to establish iron works at Lynn (Saugus Iron Works) and Braintree, Massachusetts. In 1645, he obtained title to lands in southeastern Connecticut and founded New London in 1646, where he settled in 1650. He built a grist mill in the town and was granted a monopoly on the trade for as long as he or his heirs maintained it. This was one of the first monopolies granted in New England. One of Winthrop's Indian servants was Robin Cassacinamon, who became an influential Pequot leader through Winthrop's patronage.

Governor of the Connecticut Colony
Winthrop became one of the magistrates of the Connecticut Colony in 1651, was governor of the colony in 1657–58, and again became governor in 1659, being annually re-elected until his death. During his tenure as Governor of Connecticut, he oversaw the acceptance of Quakers who were banned from Massachusetts. In 1662, he obtained the charter in England which united the colonies of Connecticut and New Haven. He was also one of the commissioners of the United Colonies of New England in 1675.

While in England, he was elected as a Fellow of the newly organized Royal Society, and he contributed two papers to their Philosophical Transactions: "Some Natural Curiosities from New England" and "Description, Culture and Use of Maize". His correspondence with the Royal Society was published in series I, vol. xvi of the Massachusetts Historical Society's Proceedings.

Personal life
Winthrop married his cousin Mary Fones, the daughter of Thomas Fones II and Anne (née Winthrop) on February 8, 1630/1. She and their infant daughter died in Agawam (Ipswich) in 1634.

Winthrop's second wife was Elizabeth Reade (1615–1672), the daughter of Col. Edmund Reade and Elizabeth (née Cooke). They had nine children, including:

 Elizabeth Winthrop (1636–1716), who married Rev. Antipas Newman and Dr. Zerubbabel Endecott, son of Gov. John Endecott
 Fitz-John Winthrop (1638–1707), who served as major-general in the army, an agent in London for Connecticut (1683–1687), and governor of Connecticut from 1696 until his death in 1707 
 Lucy Winthrop (1640–1676), who married Maj. Edward Palmes
 Waitstill Winthrop (1642–1717), who married Mary Browne (1656–1690)
 Mary "Mercy" Winthrop (1644–1740), who married the Rev. John Culver III
 Sara Winthrop (1644–1704), who married the Rev. John Culver III
 Margaret Winthrop (–1711), who married John Corwin
 Martha Winthrop (1648–1712), who married Richard Wharton
 Anne Winthrop (–1704), who married John Richards (son of accused witch Wealthean (née Loring) Richards)

Winthrop died in Boston on April 6, 1676 where he had gone to attend a meeting of the commissioners of the United Colonies of New England.

Descendants
Paul Dudley Sargent was a descendant of Winthrop, a Patriot colonel in the American War of Independence. Another descendant was John Sargent, who was a Loyalist during that war. Another descendant was Dudley Saltonstall (1738–1796), a Revolutionary War naval commander most notable for his involvement in the ill-fated Penobscot Expedition.

References

External links
 

Biographical sketch of Winthrop at State Library Web site

1606 births
1676 deaths
People of colonial Connecticut
English emigrants
Colonial governors of Connecticut
Lieutenant Governors of Connecticut
Original Fellows of the Royal Society
People educated at King Edward VI School, Bury St Edmunds
Magistrates of the Connecticut General Court (1636–1662)
American ironmasters
Winthrop family